Richard Kim Milford (February 7, 1951 – June 16, 1988), known professionally as Kim Milford, was an American actor, singer-songwriter, and composer. He was known for his stage acting in musicals such as The Rocky Horror Show and Jesus Christ Superstar.

Early years
Born in Glen Ridge, New Jersey, Milford grew up in Winnetka, Illinois. His older sister, Penelope, also became an actress. Milford attended New Trier High School.

Career

Acting
Milford first appeared at the stock theatre in Chicago at age 10. In 1971, he appeared at The Kennedy Center in Leonard Bernstein’s Mass. Age 17, he was in the original stage version of Hair on Broadway, playing Woof and Claude. In 1976, he was awarded the Faith and Freedom Award by the Religious Heritage of America for his portrayal of the Prodigal Son in Round Trip. Milford later performed in the first concert tour of Jesus Christ Superstar playing Jesus and Judas. He also appeared in the original American production of The Rocky Horror Show as Rocky with the Los Angeles Roxy Cast and in the Broadway production. He reprised his role in the 1980 North American Tour production. He also appeared in the plays Henry Sweet Henry (1967), Your Own Thing, Rockabye Hamlet (1975–76), More Than You Deserve, Sunset, and All Bets Off.

In addition to stage work, Milford appeared in the 1975 television movies Song of the Succubus and Rock-a-Die-Baby (also known as Night of the Full Moon) in which he performed music with his band Moon. During the 1970s and 1980s, he had guest roles on The Mod Squad and Mannix and The Highwayman, and starred in the 1978 feature film Laserblast and appeared in Corvette Summer. He also had a recurring role as Tommy on the soap opera The Secret Storm.

Music
Milford briefly became vocalist for Beck, Bogert & Appice, billed as The Jeff Beck Group, for six performances between July 24 to August 8, 1972. He was also the front man for his own band Moon who were co-writers on songs such as  "Lovin' Lady", "Jo Anna" and "She's Puttin' Me Through Changes". According to an interview in Viva, Milford recorded an album Chain Your Lovers to the Bedposts and a single "Help Is on the Way, Rozea" released in 1974. He recorded the single "Muddy River Water" for (Decca Records), the Sunset soundtrack and appeared on the Roxy cast album of Rocky Horror Show.

Milford composed the music for Salome, based on the Oscar Wilde play and starred in it at Mark Taper Forum in Los Angeles in 1979. He  wrote and performed "My Love Is a Rebel" on the soundtrack of Limbo, starring Barry Bostwick. His song "Justice" appeared on the Ciao! Manhattan soundtrack.

Death
On June 16, 1988, Milford died of heart failure following open heart surgery several weeks earlier. He was 37 years old.

Discography

Albums
Chain Your Lovers to the Bedposts

Rocky Horror Show
Rocky Horror Show Original Los Angeles Cast (1974)
Rocky Horror Picture Show 15th Anniversary  (1990)
Rocky Horror Collection Original Soundtrack (1997)	
Rocky Horror Collection Original Soundtrack (2005)

Singles
"Help is on the Way, Rozea"
"Muddy River Water"

Filmography

Notes

External links
 
 

1951 births
1988 deaths
New Trier High School alumni
People from Glen Ridge, New Jersey
People from Winnetka, Illinois
Male actors from New Jersey
Male actors from Illinois
Singer-songwriters from Illinois
20th-century American singers
20th-century American male actors
American male child actors
American male dancers
American male film actors
American male musical theatre actors
American male singer-songwriters
American male television actors
American musical theatre composers
American rock guitarists
American male guitarists
American rock singers
American rock songwriters
20th-century American guitarists
Singer-songwriters from New Jersey
Guitarists from Illinois
Guitarists from New Jersey
20th-century American dancers
20th-century American male singers